The Widdersgrind (2,104 m) is a mountain in the Bernese Alps north of Oberwil in the canton of Bern. Its summit is the tripoint between the valleys of Hengstschlund, Morgete, and Simmental.

References

External links
 Widdersgrind on Hikr

Mountains of the Alps
Mountains of Switzerland
Mountains of the canton of Bern
Two-thousanders of Switzerland